The Seregovo mine is a large salt mine located in north-western Russia in Komi Republic. Seregovo represents one of the largest salt reserves in Russia having estimated reserves of 5 billion tonnes of NaCl.

References 

Salt mines in Russia